At World's End may refer to:
 Pirates of the Caribbean: At World's End, a 2007 American epic fantasy swashbuckler film
 At World's End (2009 film), a Danish action comedy film